Fort Rouge is a provincial electoral division in the Canadian province of Manitoba. It was created by redistribution in 1957, and formally came into existence in the general election of 1958.  The riding was eliminated in 1989, and re-established in 1999. It is located in the central section of the City of Winnipeg.

Fort Rouge is bordered on the east by St. Boniface, to the south by Fort Garry-Riverview, to the north by Logan, and to the west by River Heights. The actual Legislative Assembly of Manitoba building is located across the river from Fort Rouge.

The riding's population in 1996 was 20,364.  In 1999, the average family income was $49,361, and the unemployment rate was 8.70%.  39.6% of Fort Rouge's residents are listed as low-income, the sixth-highest rate in the province. Almost 80% of occupied dwelling are rentals, and over 20% of households are single-parent families. Almost 25% of Fort Rouge's residents have a university degree—one of the highest rates in the province.

Fort Rouge has an immigrant population of 20%. Eight per cent of the riding's residents are aboriginal. The service sector accounts for 21% of Fort Rouge's industry, with a further 11% in social services.

The seat was held by the Progressive Conservatives from 1958 to 1973, and was a rare bastion of Liberal strength in the province from 1973 to 1981. Lloyd Axworthy was the riding's representative from 1973 to 1979; for a time, he was the only Liberal in the legislature.

In recent years the Liberal Party have been the main challengers to the NDP and the Liberal Leader, Rana Bokhari ran here for the 2016 provincial election, where she lost to the NDP star candidate Wab Kinew. At the 2015 federal election, according to Elections Canada data, Fort Rouge voted heavily Liberal.

The district is represented by NDP leader Wab Kinew.

List of provincial representatives

Opinion polls

Electoral results

1958 general election

1959 general election

1962 general election

1966 general election

1969 general election

1973 general election

1977 general election

1979 by-election

1981 general election

1986 general election

1988 general election

1999 general election

2003 general election

2007 general election

2011 general election

2016 general election

2019 general election

Previous boundaries

References

Fort Rouge
Politics of Winnipeg
Fort Rouge, Winnipeg